Portage Township is one of twelve townships in Porter County, Indiana. As of the 2010 census, its population was 47,085. Portage Township was established in 1835.

The residents of Portage Township played pivotal roles in the conservation of the Indiana Dunes.

History
Portage Township was organized in 1836, and most likely was named after Portage County, Ohio.

The Nike Missile Site C47 and Josephus Wolf House are listed on the National Register of Historic Places.

Cities and towns
The largest community in the township is the city of Portage. The bedroom community of Ogden Dunes is also in this township.

Parks
The city of Portage has an extensive park system. Also within the township is Indiana Dunes National Park's primary beach of West Beach and a new facility called Portage Lakefront and Riverwalk.

Education

Portage Township is home to Portage Township Schools.

Higher education:

Purdue University North Central (classes offered at Portage High School)
Indiana University Northwest
Ivy Tech (classes offered at Willowcreek Middle School; full-service campus to be built in 2008)

High school:

Portage High School

Middle schools:
Willowcreek Middle School
Fegely Middle School

Elementary schools:

Aylesworth
Central
Crisman
Jones
Kyle
Myers
Saylor
South Haven

The corporation is reviewing the results of a population growth study to determine future facility needs. Current options include: 1) Constructing a ninth elementary school; 2) Constructing a third middle school; or 3) Constructing an intermediate (5th-6th grade) school. For the 2007–2008 school year the Portage Township Schools student enrollment was 8,541.

References

External links
 Indiana Township Association
 United Township Association of Indiana

Townships in Porter County, Indiana
Populated places established in 1835
Townships in Indiana